The Convergent Technologies Operating System, also known variously as CTOS, BTOS and STARSYS, is a discontinued modular, message-passing, multiprocess-based operating system.

Overview
CTOS had many innovative features for its time. System access was controlled with a user password and Volume or disk passwords. If one knew the password, for example, for a volume, one could access any file or directory on that volume (hard disk).  Each volume and directory were referenced with delimiters to identify them, and could be followed with a file name, depending on the operation, i.e. {Network Node}[VolumeName]<DirectoryName>FileName.

It was possible to custom-link the operating system to add or delete features.

CTOS supported a transparent peer-to-peer network carried over serial RS-422 cables (daisy-chain topology) and in later versions carried over twisted pair (star topology) with RS-422 adapters. Each workgroup (called a "cluster") was connected to a server (called a "master").  The workstations, normally diskless, were booted over the cluster network from the master, and could optionally be locally booted from attached hard drives.

The Inter-process communication (IPC) is primarily based on the "request" and "respond" messaging foundation that enhanced the Enterprise Application Integration among services for both internal and external environments. Thus CTOS was well known for the message-based Microkernel Architecture. Applications are added as services to the main server. Each client consumes the services via its own mailbox called "exchange" and well-published message formats. The communication works on "request codes" that are owned by the service. The operating system maintains the exchanges, message queues, scheduling, control, message passing, etc., while the service manages the messages at its own exchange using "wait", "check", and "respond" macros.

CTOS ran on Intel x86 computers, and could run concurrently with Windows NT on Unisys PC.

The system API was presented to both high-level languages and assembly language.

Programs
The assembler was very advanced, with a Lisp-like pattern-matching macro facility unmatched by almost any other assembler before or since. There was an always-resident debugger.

Most of the system programs were written in PL/M, an ALGOL-like language from Intel which compiled directly to object code without a runtime library.

The word processor was one of the first screen-oriented editors with many high-powered features, such as multiple views of the same file, cut/copy/paste, unlimited undo/redo, no typing lost after a crash or power failure, user-selectable fonts, and much more.

The spreadsheet allowed blocks of cells to be protected from editing or other user input. The BTOS version allowed scripts to be written that included opening the spreadsheet for user input, then automatically printing graphs based on the input data.

The system shell was extensible, making it possible to define new commands. To get the parameters, the system would display the form which was to be filled out by the user. The input form had conventions for mandatory and optional input fields, which made it very easy to train new users.

Usage
Convergent Technologies' first product was the IWS (Integrated Workstation) based on the Intel 8086 processor, which had CTOS as its operating system. This was a modular operating system with built-in local area networking. CTOS supported multiple processes or threads, and message-based interprocess communication.

Companies that licensed CTOS included Bull (STARSYS), and Burroughs (BTOS) who later merged with Sperry to become Unisys. Unisys was the single largest customer and acquired Convergent Technologies in 1988. At its peak, CTOS had over 800,000 users worldwide.

CTOS is no longer marketed to new customers. Former major customers included police forces, banks, airlines, Nationwide Insurance, U-Haul, the U.S. Postal Service, the Drug Enforcement Administration, the U.S. Army and the United States Coast Guard. The Coast Guard used the operating system from approximately 1984 until 2000.  In Australia, CTOS/BTOS was used by the Trade Practices Commission, NSW Auditor-General's, CSIRO, Commonwealth Electoral Office, Western Australia Prisons Department and many commercial banks.

Diskless workstations (e.g., Bull) based on Convergent's NGEN used the Intel 80186 processor, a processor seldom used by standard PCs.

Progress Software Corporation made a commercial database application for CTOS that was in 4GL. The United States Coast Guard used these databases for logistics administration for their vessels.

There was a port of CorelDRAW for CTOS running the Presentation Manager.

References

External links
The CTOS FAQ October 1999
CTOS Revealed, Byte, December 1994
Paul Mooney's CTOS Central
The CTOS FAQ Picture Archive
Exhuming CTOS: The Convergent Technologies Project, Nadia Ilyin
Convergent archive at bitsavers.org

Computer-related introductions in 1980
Discontinued operating systems
Proprietary operating systems
Unisys operating systems